Andre Payne is an American college basketball coach who previously served as the head coach of the Mississippi Valley State men's team.

Coaching career
Payne got his coaching start at Texas College as an assistant until 2001, when he was elevated to the head coaching position. He stayed in that role until 2006 when he accepted the head coaching and athletics director position at Wiley College, where he led the team to two Red River Athletic Conference tournament titles.

On July 11, 2014 Payne accepted the head coaching position at Mississippi Valley State.

On March 25, 2019, Payne was fired after just winning 31 games overall in 5 seasons at MVSU.

Head coaching record

NAIA

NCAA DI

References

Living people
American men's basketball coaches
Basketball coaches from Alabama
Mississippi Valley State Delta Devils basketball coaches
Sportspeople from Auburn, Alabama
Auburn High School (Alabama) alumni
Year of birth missing (living people)